Since the 1960s, The Marvel Comics superhero, Thor has appeared in a wide variety of media outside of comic books including films, television  programs and video games.

Television

1960s

Thor starred in the segment "The Mighty Thor" of The Marvel Super Heroes, originally syndicated in 1966. There were thirteen episodes that centered on Thor, who was voiced by Chris Wiggins who also voiced his human host Donald Blake.

1980s
 Thor's Donald Blake identity appeared in the 1980s Spider-Man episode "Wrath of the Sub-Mariner" voiced by Jack Angel.
 Thor appeared in an episode of Spider-Man and His Amazing Friends titled "Vengeance of Loki".
 Thor appeared in the live action television film The Incredible Hulk Returns. Thor was played by Eric Allan Kramer, and Donald Blake by Steve Levitt. In this version Blake does not transform into Thor, but rather they were two separate individuals. Donald Blake was a former student of David Banner and tracked down Banner to ask for his help. Blake was a mountaineer as well as a doctor and was climbing a mountain in Norway when he felt the need to get to the top of the mountain, and there he found a cave in which he found the hammer Mjölnir. When he shouted "Odin!" Blake summoned the Viking warrior Thor, who was a spirit that cannot be admitted into Asgard until he has proved himself worthy. At first Banner was skeptical of Blake's story, but when Blake summoned Thor, his story was verified. Thor accidentally caused Banner to turn into the Hulk and the two fought to a standstill, but later Thor and the Hulk worked together to defeat a common enemy. Before the events of the movie Blake was always being overruled by Thor; but with the help of his former mentor (Banner), he was able to establish a more equal footing with Thor. In this movie Thor is portrayed as a fun-loving warrior who is very happy drinking beer, fighting with men, and carousing with women.
Artwork by Jack Kirby from a planned Thor animated series by Ruby-Spears Productions has surfaced.

1990s
 Thor guest stars in two episodes of Fantastic Four voiced by John Rhys-Davies. In "To Battle the Living Planet", the Fantastic Four help him fight Ego the Living Planet. In "When Calls Galactus", he and Ghost Rider help the Fantastic Four fight Galactus.
 John Rhys-Davies reprises his role as Thor in the Incredible Hulk episode "Mortal Bounds" with Mark L. Taylor voicing Donald Blake. Blake as Thor brought the Hulk to Detroit so that Bruce Banner can help cure a gamma-based outbreak unknowingly caused by the Gargoyle in his search to cure his disfigurement.
Thor makes a cameo in the X-Men episode "The Dark Phoenix Saga (Part 3): The Dark Phoenix", when the Phoenix rises up into the sky, her mind shows Thor's hammer Mjölnir reacting to her presence.
 Thor appears in the introduction for The Avengers: United They Stand, but was never actually featured in the show.

2000s

A Thor TV series was in development in 2000.
Thor is featured in The Super Hero Squad Show, with Dave Boat reprising his role from the first two Ultimate Avengers movies. Here, he is a narcissistic, but loyal member of the team who is in love with the Valkyrie. He has an intense sibling rivalry with his brother Loki, who claims "Odin always liked you better."

2010s
 Thor appears as a major character in The Avengers: Earth's Mightiest Heroes, voiced by Rick D. Wasserman. In this version, Thor chooses to come to Earth to use his powers to help mortals, despite the protests of Odin.
 Marvel Animation announced a 26-episode animated series in November 2008, to air in late 2010 before the release of Marvel Studios' film but the series was never produced.
 The Super Hero Squad Show version of Thor makes a cameo in Ultimate Spider-Man, voiced again by Dave Boat, in the episode "Flight of the Iron Spider". Thor later appears in the show, where he was voiced by Travis Willingham, in the episode "Field Trip" and is turned into a frog after a fight with a Frost Giant. The spell is lifted with the help of Spider-Man and his team. In "Run Pig Pun", Thor protects Spider-Man, who has been transformed into a pig by Loki, from a boar hunt led by Executioner. In both of the episodes he appears in, Thor calls Phil Coulson "Son of Coul."
 Thor appears in Avengers Assemble with Travis Willingham reprising his role from Ultimate Spider-Man.
 Thor appeared in Phineas and Ferb: Mission Marvel, voiced again by Travis Willingham.
 The Marvel Cinematic Universe version of Thor and Mjölnir briefly appear via footage from Thor in the pilot episode of Agents of S.H.I.E.L.D. as Skye outlines public knowledge of superhumans, as well as the episode "The Well".
 Thor appears in Lego Marvel Super Heroes: Maximum Overload, voiced again by Travis Willingham.
 Thor appears in Hulk and the Agents of S.M.A.S.H., voiced again by Travis Willingham.
 Thor appears in Marvel Disk Wars: The Avengers, voiced by Yasuyuki Kase in the Japanese dubbed version. In the English dubbed version, he was voiced again by Travis Willingham. 
 Thor appears in Lego Marvel Super Heroes: Avengers Reassembled, voiced again by Travis Willingham.
 Thor appears in Guardians of the Galaxy, voiced again by Travis Willingham.
 Thor appears in Lego Marvel Super Heroes - Guardians of the Galaxy: The Thanos Threat, voiced again by Travis Willingham.

2020s
 Thor appears in the anime series Marvel Future Avengers, voiced by Patrick Seitz in the English dubbed version. In the Japanese dubbed version, he was reprised by Yasuyuki Kase.
 Thor appears in the Spider-Man episode "Maximum Venom", with Travis Willingham reprising his role from various Marvel media.

Marvel Cinematic Universe 
 Chris Hemsworth reprised his role as Thor in the Disney+ animated series What If...?.

Film

Live-action

In 1990, after finishing with the filming of Darkman, Sam Raimi and Stan Lee originally pitched the concept of a Thor feature film to 20th Century Fox. However, they did not understand Raimi's and Lee's idea and the project was abandoned.

Marvel Cinematic Universe 
Chris Hemsworth stars as the character in the Marvel Cinematic Universe, first appearing in Thor (2011), The Avengers (2012), Thor: The Dark World (2013), Avengers: Age of Ultron (2015), Thor: Ragnarok (2017) Avengers: Infinity War (2018), Avengers: Endgame (2019), and Thor: Love and Thunder (2022). Hemsworth cameos in the mid-credits of Doctor Strange (2016).
 Dakota Goyo portrays a young Thor in the 2011 film Thor.

Animation

 Ultimate Thor appears in Marvel Animation's direct-to-video animated features Ultimate Avengers (2006) and Ultimate Avengers 2 (2006) voiced by Dave Boat.
 Thor makes an appearance in the direct-to-video animated movie Next Avengers: Heroes of Tomorrow voiced by Michael Adamthwaite.
 Thor appears as the protagonist in the direct-to-video animated short film Hulk vs. Thor voiced by Matthew Wolf.
 Thor makes a brief appearance in the film Planet Hulk (2010). He is seen in a flashback scene fighting Korg and his Kronan brothers alongside Beta Ray Bill.
 Thor appears again in Thor: Tales of Asgard, an animated direct-to-video feature released in 2011, with Matthew Wolf reprising his role from Hulk Vs.
 Thor appears in the anime film Avengers Confidential: Black Widow & Punisher.
 Thor appears in Marvel Super Hero Adventures: Frost Fight, voiced again by Travis Willingham.
 Thor makes an appearance in Lego Marvel Super Heroes - Black Panther: Trouble in Wakanda, voiced again by Travis Willingham.

Video games
 Thor appears as an assist character in the 1995 arcade game Avengers in Galactic Storm.
 The Eric Masterson version of Thor appears as a background character in Thanos' stage and in Captain America's ending in Marvel Super Heroes.
 Thor appears as a partner assist in Marvel vs. Capcom: Clash of Super Heroes.
 Thor was originally slated to appear in a cameo at the end of the Spider-Man 2: Enter Electro video game conversing with Spider-Man, but due to the 9/11 attacks in September of 2001, his scene was scrapped and the final boss fight had to change location in the final stages of the game's development. To replace this, the ending showed the Daily Bugle crediting Thor for saving New York from Electro, much to Spider-Man's disappointment.
 Thor appears as a playable character in Marvel: Ultimate Alliance voiced by Cam Clarke.
 Thor appears as a playable character in Marvel: Ultimate Alliance 2 voiced by Jim Cummings.
 Thor appears in the Marvel Super Hero Squad game as a playable character voiced by Dave Boat.
 Thor appears as a playable character in Marvel Super Hero Squad: The Infinity Gauntlet once again voiced by Dave Boat.
 Thor appears as a playable character in Marvel vs. Capcom 3: Fate of Two Worlds and Ultimate Marvel vs. Capcom 3. Rick D. Wasserman reprises his role from The Avengers: Earth's Mightiest Heroes.
 A video game based on the live-action film entitled Thor: God of Thunder was developed by Sega, with Chris Hemsworth reprising his role from the 2011 film of the same name.
 Thor is a playable character in Marvel Super Hero Squad Online, in his modern and classic outfits as well as his Ultimate persona.
 Thor is available as downloadable content for the game LittleBigPlanet, as part of "Marvel Costume Kit 2".
 Thor is a playable character in Marvel Super Hero Squad: Comic Combat, voiced again by Dave Boat.
 A Thor table was released as part of the downloadable Vengeance & Virtue package in Marvel Pinball, with Thor being voiced by Travis Willingham.
 Thor is a playable character in the Facebook/mobile game Marvel: Avengers Alliance.
 Thor is a playable character in Marvel Avengers Alliance Tactics. 
 Thor appears as a playable character in the 2012 fighting game Marvel Avengers: Battle for Earth, voiced by James Arnold Taylor.
 Thor is a playable character in the  MMORPG Marvel Heroes, voiced again by Rick D. Wasserman.
 Thor is a playable character in Lego Marvel Super Heroes voiced again by Travis Willingham.
 Thor is a playable character in Marvel: Contest of Champions. He appears in his comics form, but he will also have a Thor: Ragnarok version, with Travis Willingham reprising his role in an official trailer only.
 Thor is a playable character in Disney Infinity: Marvel Super Heroes, voiced again by Travis Willingham.
 Thor is a playable character in Disney Infinity 3.0, voiced again by Travis Willingham.
 Thor is a playable character in Marvel: Future Fight.
 A teenage version of Thor is a playable character in Marvel Avengers Academy, voiced by Colton Haynes. A teenage version of Thor Noir also appears as a playable character, voiced by Billy Kametz.
Thor appears as a playable character in Marvel vs. Capcom: Infinite, with Travis Willingham reprising his role.
 There are three playable versions of Thor ("Marvel NOW", "Modern" and "Gladiator") in the match-three mobile game Marvel Puzzle Quest.
 Thor is a playable character in Marvel Powers United VR, with Travis Willingham reprising his role.
 Thor appears in Marvel Battle Lines, voiced again by Travis Willingham.
 Thor appears as a playable character in Marvel Ultimate Alliance 3: The Black Order, reprised by Rick D. Wasserman.
 Thor appears in Marvel Dimension of Heroes, voiced again by Travis Willingham.
 Thor appears as a playable character in Marvel's Avengers, with Travis Willingham reprising his role.
 Thor is an unlockable outfit in Fortnite Battle Royale in the Marvel-themed Chapter 2, Season 4, with Travis Willingham reprising his role in a promotional trailer and in the live event itself. A comic detailing Thor and Galactus' arrival in the Fortnite universe was later released. It was written by Donny Cates, illustrated by Jay Leisten, colored by Frank D'Armata, and uses Nic Klein's designs for the characters.
 Thor appears in Marvel Future Revolution, with Rick D. Wasserman reprising his role.

Motion comic
A four episode motion comic titled Thor & Loki: Blood Brothers, based on the graphic novel Loki by Robert Rodi and Esad Ribić, was released on March 28, 2011 on iTunes, Xbox Live, and the PlayStation Network.

Theatre
 Thor appears in the Marvel Universe Live! stage show.

Novels and short stories
 Thor appeared in two Avengers novels, The Man Who Stole Tomorrow by David Michelinie in 1979 and The Avengers vs. The Thunderbolts by Pierce Askegren in 1998.
 Thor also appeared in the Loki story by Michael Jan Friedman in The Ultimate Super-Villains, edited by Stan Lee, in 1996.
 The Ultimates version of Thor appeared in the two Ultimates novels published in 2006-2007, The Tomorrow Men by Friedman and Against All Enemies by Alex Irvine
 Thor starred in his first solo novel in 2015, Marvel's Thor: Dueling with Giants by Keith R.A. DeCandido, Book 1 of the Tales of Asgard trilogy. He also appears as a supporting character in the subsequent two books, Marvel's Sif: Even Dragons Have Their Endings and Marvel's Warriors Three: Godhood's End.

Audio serial
 In early 2019, Serial Box Publishing announced a weekly audio serial starring Thor. Mandy co-write Aaron Stewart-Ahn will lead the serial's writing team, which includes Jay Edidin, Brian Keene and Yoon Ha Lee.

References

External links